Văn Cao (born Nguyễn Văn Cao, ; 15 November 192310 July 1995) was a Vietnamese composer whose works include Tiến Quân Ca, which became the national anthem of Vietnam. He, along with Phạm Duy and Trịnh Công Sơn, is widely considered one of the three most salient figures of 20th-century (non-classical) Vietnamese music. 

He was also a notable poet and a painter. In 1996, he was posthumously awarded the Hồ Chí Minh Prize for Music.

Career
After the Nhân Văn–Giai Phẩm affair, a movement for political and cultural freedom in 1956, he had to stop composing. Most of his songs, except Tiến Quân Ca, Làng Tôi, Tiến Về Hà Nội, and Trường Ca Sông Lô were prohibited in North Vietnam.

All of his songs were once again authorized in Vietnam until after the Đổi Mới, 1987.

In 1991, the American composer Robert Ashley composed the solo piano piece Văn Cao's Meditation, which is based on the image of Văn Cao playing his piano.

Works

Songs

 Bài ca Chiến sĩ Hải quân (1945) ("Song for marines")
 Bến xuân (1942) ("Spring river dock", music by Văn Cao, lyric written together with Phạm Duy)
 Buồn tàn thu (1939) ("Sadness at the end of autumn", the first song of Văn Cao)
 Chiến sĩ Việt Nam (1945) ("Vietnamese soldiers")
 Cung đàn xưa ("The old tune")
 Đàn chim Việt (1944) ("Vietnamese flock of birds" - rewritten lyric from Bến xuân)
 Đêm sơn cước ("A night in the mountain")
 Gò Đống Đa (1942) ("Đống Đa Mound")
 Hải quân Việt Nam hành khúc (1945) ("Vietnamese navy march")
 Hò kéo gỗ Bạch Đằng Giang (1941)
 Không quân Việt Nam hành khúc (1945) ("Vietnamese air force march")
 Làng tôi (1947) ("My Village")
 Mùa xuân đầu tiên (1976) ("The first spring" - after Reunification Day, it was also the last song of Văn Cao)
 Ngày mai ("Tomorrow")
 Ngày mùa (1948) ("Harvest")
 Suối mơ ("Dreamy stream")
 Thăng Long hành khúc ca (Thang Long marching song)
 Thiên Thai (1941) ("Eden")
 Thu cô liêu
 Tiến Quân Ca (1944) (Army marching song) 
 Tiến về Hà Nội (March on Hanoi)
 Tình ca Trung du (Trung du's love song) 
 Trương Chi (1943) ("Not a word but a name")
 Trường ca sông Lô (1947) ("Lô river epic")

Poems

 Anh có nghe thấy không (Feb 1956) ("Do you hear?". Published in Giai phẩm Spring)
 Những người trên cửa biển (1956) ("People at the sea gate", Epic about people of Hải Phòng)
 Lá (1988) ("Leaves", poetry collection)

Paintings

 Cô gái dậy thì (Puberty girl)
 Thái Hà ấp đêm mưa (Rainy night in Thái Hà hamlet)
 Cuộc khiêu vũ của những người tự tử' (1944) ("Dance of the suicides")

References

External links
Biography of Văn Cao
Van Cao - Composer of Patriotism and Love

1923 births
1995 deaths
People from Haiphong
Vietnamese composers
National anthem writers
Nhân Văn–Giai Phẩm affair
20th-century Vietnamese painters